LGBT art in Singapore, or queer art in Singapore, broadly refers to modern and contemporary visual art practices that draw on lesbian, gay, bisexual, and transgender+ imagery and themes, addressing topics such as LGBT rights, history and culture in Singapore. Such queer art practices are often by Singaporean or Singapore-based visual artists and curators who identify as LGBT+ or queer.

Queer visual art is a notable countercultural facet of contemporary Singaporean society, which currently criminalises, albeit unenforced, consensual, private sexual acts between men (legal for women) through the continued presence of laws such as Section 377A of the Penal Code. 

As homosexuality has been considered a taboo subject, practitioners in Singapore have historically contended with a host of limitations, with the avoidance of positive queer representation in local mainstream media, to operating with the risk of being blacklisted by the state, or vilification due to homophobia and transphobia from conservative aspects of wider Singaporean society. Ever since the early 2010s however, LGBT+ topics have been gradually liberalised, with regular discussions about such topics in the public sphere and local mainstream media. This was also in tandem with the rise of Pink Dot SG, which has now also influenced such events in many countries around the world.

In Singapore's contemporary art history, openly out queer artists whose art practices engage with notions of queerness have been documented since the 1980s. Queer art practices from Singapore have also been exhibited internationally, more often beyond the specific curatorial framework of a queer art exhibition. These art practices are loosely connected, and not determined by a specific medium, spanning wide-ranging forms such as performance art, installation art, video art, drawing, painting, sculpture, photography, film, and mixed media, for instance.

Regulations
Practitioners of LGBT+ visual arts have to contend with various restrictions imposed by Singaporean law. Alongside Section 377A of the Penal Code, which de jure but not de facto criminalises consensual, private sexual acts between men, strict censorship laws remain in place regarding LGBT+ representation in Singapore, among other sensitive topics.

At the end of May 2005, in an amendment to the Public Entertainment and Meetings Act (Chapter 257), nine categories of arts entertainment events including "displays or exhibitions of art objects or paintings" were exempted from having to apply for a Public Entertainment Licence from the Media Development Authority (MDA). The decision was made after consultation with MDA's arts advisory groups, following the recommendations of the 2003 Censorship Review Committee appointed by the Government arts watchdog of the time, the Ministry of Information, Communications and the Arts (MITA) to exempt more arts entertainment from licensing. The 2005 exhibition at The Substation, Bao Bei, by Singaporean artist Jason Wee, which featured pixelated male genitalia, was mentioned in the press release and deemed to be "innocuous" by the state.

History

Early contemporary activity (1980s to 1990s) 
From the 1980s to 1990s, artists such as Jimmy Ong, Teng Nee Cheong, and Ho Soon Yeen were notable for being some of the few openly queer artists of the time, or whose practices engaged with notions of queerness in Singapore. Ong's work from the 1980s, for instance, would feature black-and-white charcoal drawings that depicted nude, queer male bodies in various contexts and relationships. Around the same period in the 1980s, Teng would be known for figurative works across watercolour, pastel, charcoal and oil, with sensual and homoerotic depictions of male nudes.

In 1992, as part of The Substation's New Criteria exhibition series, Ho would exhibit alongside artist Dominique Hui for We Kissed, a show that would explore notions of sexuality through drawings, collages, and three-dimensional works. One of her paintings on display was a self-portrait, titled Monkey & Thinker, now in the collection of NUS Museum and shown at their 2017 exhibition, Radio Malaya: Abridged Conversations About Art.

From 20 to 28 February 1993, Singapore artist Tan Peng and US artist, John C. Goss held an exhibition entitled Flowing Forest, Burning Hearts at The Substation gallery, and Tan notably came out publicly in mainstream press as a gay man. Tan's large pastel drawings tackled topics such as HIV caregiving and police entrapment.

Brother Cane (1994) 
From 26 December 1993 to 1 January 1994, the Artists' General Assembly (AGA) was held at the 5th Passage art space, an arts festival co-organised with The Artists Village. During the 12-hour AGA New Year's Eve show from 31 December 1993 to 1 January 1994, Josef Ng staged a performance work, Brother Cane, in protest at the arrest of 12 homosexual men during anti-gay operations in 1993, whose personal details were published in local mainstream newspapers.

During the final minutes of the performance, Ng turned his back to the audience and trimmed his pubic hair, a moment photographed by The New Paper. Media coverage of the performance portrayed this as an obscene act. Following the public outcry, 5th Passage was charged with breaching the conditions of its Public Entertainment License, blacklisted from funding by Singapore's National Arts Council, and evicted from its Parkway Parade site. Iris Tan, as the gallery manager of the 5th Passage art space, was prosecuted by the Singapore High Court alongside Ng. Described as one of the "darkest moments of Singapore’s contemporary art scene", the incident led to a ten-year no-funding rule for performance art, a ruling lifted only in 2003.

Activity in the 2000s 
In August 2004, three LGBT+ art exhibitions were held at local galleries as part of the cultural activities surrounding Nation.04, an early LGBT+ pride event in Singapore, featuring the work of queer artists both locally and regionally. Red + White = Pink was held at Utterly Art, with participating artists including Genevieve Chua, Tania De Rozario, Jane Porter, Aidah Dolrahim, Teng Nee Cheong, Martin Loh, Desmond Sim, Ernest Chan Tuck Yew, Justin Lee, Michael Lee Hong Hwee, Han Kiang Siew, Zulharli Adnan, Brian Gothong Tan, Lim Jit Hwang, Sazeli Jalal, Jason Wee, Daniel Poh, Wong Hong Weng, Nicholas Chai and Aiman Hakim. Other exhibitions included Erotica at Art Seasons and Private Edge at B2G Gallery.

In May 2005, New York-based Singaporean artist Jason Wee held an exhibition at The Substation gallery titled Bao Bei, which examined the ways through which identity was constructed in gay online personal ads, also using online self-portraits to recreate a scene from the late Singaporean playwright Kuo Pao Kun's Descendants of the Eunuch Admiral.

At the prestigious 53rd Venice Biennale in 2009, Ming Wong represented Singapore at the national pavilion with Life of Imitation. The exhibition, which explored cinema history, featured video installations in which Wong cross-dressed to play various characters from world cinema, a performance that the artist views as a form of drag. The artist was awarded a Special Mention during the Biennale's Opening Ceremony, the first for a Singaporean artist at the Venice Biennale.

Activity in the 2010s 
At the 3rd Singapore Biennale in 2011, Japanese-British artist Simon Fujiwara's work, Welcome to the Hotel Munber (2010), was censored by the Singapore Art Museum (SAM), despite appropriate advisory notices put up by the museum itself as the organiser of the Biennale. The homoerotic content of the work was considered to contravene the law on pornography by the museum, and contextually relevant gay pornographic magazines were removed from the installation without prior consultation with either the artist, biennale director Matthew Ngui or curators Russell Storer and Trevor Smith. While the curatorial team and artist were informed a little later, extended discussions and negotiations took so long that the temporary closure of the work, called for by the artist, became permanent as the Biennale came to an end.

In February 2012, as part of the M1 Singapore Fringe Festival, Loo Zihan staged a one-night only performance of Cane, which controversially re-enacted the significant 1994 performance art piece, Brother Cane, by Josef Ng. In December 2012, Loo organised his first solo exhibition Archiving Cane at The Substation, which consisted of an installation of 12 artefacts from Cane and Loo's artistic practice, along with a durational performance.

In 2016, the queer-themed exhibition, Fault-Lines: Disparate And Desperate Intimacies, was held at the Institute of Contemporary Arts Singapore, guest curated by Singapore-based curator and writer Wong Binghao. For the exhibition, Loo Zihan presented Queer Objects: An Archive for the Future, an installation consisting of 81 objects such as perfume bottles and torch lights used at Pink Dot, the annual LGBT+ rights event in Singapore; all of which presented without context to "permit viewers to construct their own narratives for the objects based on their individual experiences". Two objects, both of which were sex toys, were later removed as the institute was concerned that they contravened Section 292 1(a) of the Penal Code, which prohibits the display of obscene materials. Other Singaporean artists in the exhibition included transgender artist Marla Bendini, known for her work exploring transgender issues.

Loo Zihan would open the M1 Singapore Fringe Festival 2015 with With/Out, a performance installation based on The Necessary Stage's Completely With/Out Character (1999), a monologue by the late Paddy Chew, the first person in Singapore to come out as being HIV-positive. In 2015, Loo was also awarded the Young Artist Award by the National Arts Council of Singapore, and selected to exhibit for the President's Young Talents (PYT) competition at the Singapore Art Museum (SAM) the same year.

IndigNation art events

In August 2005, after organisers of the annual Nation party had their application to hold the event in Singapore abruptly rejected by the police, gay activists organised Singapore's first month-long gay pride celebration called IndigNation. An exhibition by openly gay artist Martin Loh opened in July 2005 at the Utterly Art exhibition space in South Bridge Road entitled Cerita Budak-Budak, meaning "Children's Stories" in Peranakan Malay. The second art exhibition of IndigNation was held from 10 to 16 August 2005 at The Box, entitled Solitary Desire and featuring pieces by Ong Jenn Long and Steve Chua, both of whom were young artists.

References

Further reading 

 

Art movements in Asia
LGBT art
LGBT culture in Singapore
Gay Art